Oz is an unincorporated community and coal town located in McCreary County, Kentucky, United States.

References

Unincorporated communities in McCreary County, Kentucky
Unincorporated communities in Kentucky
Coal towns in Kentucky